Picnic Point, a suburb of local government area City of Canterbury-Bankstown, is 23 kilometres south-west of the Sydney central business district, in the state of New South Wales, Australia. It is a part of South-western Sydney region . Picnic Point is a residential suburb on the northern bank of the Georges River. Located within Picnic Point is Yeramba Lagoon which is the largest tract of National Park within the Canterbury – Bankstown Council, it is home to numerous species of native fauna and flora.

History

Picnic Point was the name given to the geographical feature on the Georges River. The suburb was originally part of East Hills, which stretched south from Bankstown to the river and east to The River Road. Picnic Point was gazetted as a suburb in 1975, with new boundaries gazetted in 1994.

During World War II, Picnic Point National Park was the location of a remote receiving station and operations bunker that was owned and operated by the RAAF. This facility was used in conjunction with two other facilities, one of them located in Bankstown, the Bankstown Bunker, which was RAAF headquarters at the time and the other in Bass Hill which was a transmitting station in Johnston Road. The location of the remote receiving station in Picnic Point is now located under the Transgrid South Sydney electricity sub station.

Schools
 Picnic Point High School
Picnic Point Public School

Sport and recreation
Picnic Point features a number of parks and reserves along the river, including the Georges River National Park. As the suburb's name suggests, the area is popular with picnickers. The boat ramps provide access to the river for boating and watersports such as waterskiing and wakeboarding.

References

City of Canterbury-Bankstown
Suburbs of Sydney